Journey in the Dark is a 1943 novel by Martin Flavin. It won both the 1943 Harper Prize and the 1944 Pulitzer Prize, and was printed as an Armed Services Edition. The New York Times called the book "a story of a boy from Iowa who becomes a business tycoon at the price of his integrity.”

References

External links
 Photos of the first edition of Journey in the Dark

1943 American novels
Pulitzer Prize for the Novel-winning works
Harper & Brothers books